Makothai Mahadevar Temple is a Hindu temple dedicated to the deity Shiva, located at Kodungallur in Thrissur district of Kerala, India.

Vaippu Sthalam
It is one of the shrines of the Vaippu Sthalams sung by Tamil Saivite Nayanars Appar and Sundarar.

Presiding deity
The presiding deity in the garbhagriha, is represented by the lingam is known as Makothai Mahadevar.

Specialities
Kodungallur was the capital city of Cheras. This place is also known as "Makothai". Very near to this place, Thiruvanchikualam is found, where there is also a Shiva temple. In the east of the shrine of the goddess, the Kannagi temple of Cenkuttuvan is found.

Location
This place is located at a distance of 40 km. from Thrissur.

References

Hindu temples in Kerala
Shiva temples in Kerala